Summercourt is a village in mid Cornwall, England, United Kingdom. It is in the civil parish of St Enoder five miles (8 km) southeast of Newquay.

Education

There is a village school, Summercourt Community Primary School, which is a combined primary and junior school. It has a capacity of just over 100 pupils.
The school started its life as the National School, Summercourt, in 1828 and was the first school in the area - taking children from Summercourt, Fraddon, Mitchell and even Indian Queens. At first it was only for boys - and consisted of one small room. A year later, girls were also permitted to attend.
Since that time, the school has increased in size considerably.

The village today
The village has a pub (the London Inn on School Road), a restaurant and pub (The Fox's Revenge at nearby Carvynick) and there is a convenience store ("Summercourt Village Store" on Beacon Road) which incorporates a post office. The bus company Kernow (formerly First Kernow) has a depot in village which it inherited from the failed Western Greyhound bus company.

Summercourt fair 

Summercourt fair is a Charter fair held in Summercourt in the last week of September each year; at over 800 years old, it is the longest-established fair in Cornwall.

References

External links

Villages in Cornwall